Al-Hindiya Sport Club, is an Iraqi football team based in Al-Hindiya District, Karbala, that plays in the Iraq Division Two.

History

in Premier League
Al-Hindiya played in the Iraqi Premier League for the first time in the 2009–10 season, and finished 11th in Group 1, won 7 matches, drew 13 and lost 13, and was able to continue playing in the Premier League for a second season. In the following season, 2010–11, the team was very bad, as it finished the season bottom of the standings in Group 2, after winning only 2 matches, drawing 4 and losing 20, and relegated to the Iraq Division One.

Managerial history
  Maitham Dael-Haq
 Fouad Jawad
 Amir Abdul-Hussein

See also 
 2020–21 Iraq FA Cup

References

External links
 Al-Hindiya SC on Goalzz.com
 Iraq Clubs- Foundation Dates

1967 establishments in Iraq
Association football clubs established in 1967
Football clubs in Karbala